Junagadh Agricultural University (JAU) is an agricultural university at Junagadh in the Indian state of Gujarat. Junagadh Agricultural University offers education in agriculture and allied sciences, i.e., agriculture, agricultural engineering and fisheries. The teaching in the university consists of four faculties: agriculture, agricultural engineering, fisheries and postgraduate studies. The graduate programmes have an intake capacity of 135 in agriculture, 70 in agricultural engineering and 30 in fisheries faculty. The postgraduate level studies are offered in agriculture and agricultural engineering according to the intake capacity of the various faculties.

There are seven multidisciplinary Main Research Stations; five Main Research Stations for various crops; and eleven sub-Research Stations/Testing Centres for the development of new varieties/hybrids of crops, vegetables and fruits. These centres also work for the development of economical and sustainable production technology packages for newly developed varieties/hybrids with modification every year. The first hybrid bajra and hybrid castor were developed by scientists of this university.

History

The College of Agriculture, Junagadh started in June 1960. The college was affiliated to Gujarat University, Ahmedabad until 1967. Affiliation was transferred to Saurashtra University in 1968.

The Gujarat Agricultural University was established in February 1972 but split into four Universities in 2004 (Gujarat Agricultural University Act - 2004). Junagadh Agricultural University is one of them; it started on 1 May 2004.

Education
College of Agriculture, Junagadh
College of Agricultural Engineering & Technology, Junagadh
College of Fisheries, Veraval
College of Veterinary Science & Animal Husbandry, Junagadh
College of Agriculture, Amreli
College of Agriculture, khapat(Porbandar)
Post Graduate Institute of Agri. Business Management, Junagadh
Polytechnic in Horticulture, Junagadh
Polytechnic in Agricultural Science, Halvad
Polytechnic in Agro-processing, Junagadh
Polytechnic in Agriculture, Dhari
Polytechnic in Agricultural Engineering, Targhadia(Rajkot)
Polytechnic in Animal Husbandry, Junagadh

Research centres

North West Agro-climatic Zone No. V 
Agricultural Research Station, Halvad (Dist.: Morbi)

North Saurashtra Agro-climatic Zone No. VI
Main Dry Farming Research Station, Targhadia (Dist.: Rajkot)
Main Pearl Millet Research Station, Jamnagar
Agricultural Research Station, Amreli
Grassland & Agricultural Research Station, Dhari (Dist.: Amreli)
Dry Farming Research Station, Jam Khambhalia (Dist.: Dev Bhumi Dwarka)
Fisheries Research Station, Okha (Dist.: Dev Bhumi Dwarka)
Fisheries Research Station, Sikka (Dist.: Jamnagar)
Cotton Research Station, Kukada (Dist.: Surendranagar)
Bull Mother Farm, Amreli

South Saurashtra Agro-climatic Zone No. VII
Main Oilseeds Research Station (Groundnut), Junagadh
Wheat Research Station, Junagadh
Cotton Research Station, Junagadh
Castor Research Station, Junagadh
Main Sugarcane Research Station, Kodinar (Dist.: Gir Somnath)
Pulses Research Station, Junagadh
Cattle Breeding Farm, Junagadh
Vegetable Research Station, Junagadh
Research, Training & Testing Centre (RTTC), Junagadh
Centre of Experimental Research Station, Sagadividi, Junagadh
Agriculture Research Station (Fruit Crops), Mahuva (Dist.: Bhavnagar)
Inland Fisheries Research Station, Junagadh
Oilseeds Research Station, Manavadar (Dist.: Junagadh)
Cotton Research Station, Khapat (Dist.: Porbandar) 
Fruit Research Station, Mangrol (Dist.: Junagadh)
Dry Farming Research Station, Ratia (Dist. : Porbandar)
Fisheries Research & Training Center, Mahuva (Dist.: Bhavnagar)
Agriculture Research Station, Talaja (Dist.: Bhavnagar)
Grassland Center, Jonpur (Dist.: Junagadh)
Spices Research Station, Junagadh

Bhal & Coastal Agro-climatic Zone No. VIII
 Dry Farming Research Station, Vallabhipur (Dist.: Bhavnagar)

Extension Education Centres

Directorate of Extension Education, Junagadh
Krishi Vigyan Kendras (KVKs):
 Krishi Vigyan Kendra, Jamnagar
 Krishi Vigyan Kendra, Targhadia (Rajkot)
 Krishi Vigyan Kendra, Nana Kandhasar
 Krishi Vigyan Kendra, Khapat (Porbandar)
 Krishi Vigyan Kendra, Amreli
 Krishi Vigyan Kendra, Pipaliya

Sardar Smruti Kendra (SSK), Junagadh
Agriculture Technology Information Center (ATIC), Junagadh
Centre of Communication Net work (COC), Junagadh
School of Baking, Junagadh
Mali Training Centre, Junagadh

External links
Official website of Junagadh Agricultural University

Agricultural universities and colleges in Gujarat
Universities in Gujarat
Junagadh
Educational institutions established in 2004
2004 establishments in Gujarat